Valentina Šakotić (born 23 September 1996) is a Bosnian footballer who plays as a forward and has appeared for the Bosnia and Herzegovina women's national team.

Career
Šakotić has been capped for the Bosnia and Herzegovina national team, appearing for the team during the 2019 FIFA Women's World Cup qualifying cycle.

Football Career Transfers and Statistics 
We are going to show you the list of football clubs and seasons in which Valentina Šakotić has played. It includes the total number of appearance (caps), substitution details, goals, yellow and red cards stats.

References

External links
 
 
 

1996 births
Living people
Bosnia and Herzegovina women's footballers
Bosnia and Herzegovina women's international footballers
Women's association football forwards